One Horse Blue was a Canadian country rock music group that existed from 1975 to 1981 and, as reconstituted, from 1988 to 1995, releasing five albums.

History

The band first formed as Pickens in 1975 in Edmonton, Alberta, with members Winston Quelch (guitar), Bob Burghardt (guitar), bassist Randy Lloyd and drummer Ron (Rocko) Vaugeois. In 1977, the band asked Ian Oscar of Stash to join on vocals. When Oscar joined, the band changed their name to One Horse Blue after the 1974 Poco song from the album Cantamos. Guitarist Michael Shellard came on board shortly after, and the band began touring across Canada. In 1978 they linked up again with producer Wes Dakus who had assisted on an earlier Pickens single; Dakus took the band into Sundown Recorders to cut their first album, One Horse Blue on Vera Cruz Records, with the lead single "Deliver Me". They charted several singles on the RPM Top Country Tracks charts and recorded four albums before disbanding in 1981.

By 1988, Shellard and Vaugeois had reformed the band, with new members Gordon Maxwell and Larry Pink, as well as Andreas Schuld taking over on guitar. This line-up recorded the band's fifth, self-titled album, released in 1993.  The album produced six Top 10 singles, including two Number One hits in "Hopeless Love" and "Bringing Back Your Love". In 1993 Schuld left the band and was replaced by  Jim Foster, co-founder of Fosterchild.

In terms of later, occasional performances, the band was recently composed of Gord Maxwell (lead vocals, bass guitar), Larry Pink (keyboards), Michael Shellard (background vocals, and Ron (Rocko) Vaugeois (drums, background vocals).

Discography

Albums

Singles

Music videos

References

Canadian country music groups
Musical groups established in 1977
Musical groups disestablished in 1995